Raphael Patkanian (also known as Kamar Katiba; 20 November 1830 – 3 September 1892) was one of the most popular Armenian poets.

Biography 
Patkanian was born in Nor Nakhichevan, Russia in 1830. His father and grandfather had been known for their poetic gifts. While at the University of Moscow, he created a literary club for his Armenian students, and from initials of their names formed his own pen-name of Kamar Katiba. Many of his poems were written during the Turco-Russian war, when the Russian Armenians had high hopes for the deliverance of Turkish Armenia from Ottoman rule. Patkanian died in 1892, after forty-two years of his continuous activity, as a teacher, author, and editor.
His hopes and ambitions can be seen in his works especially in the poem "Araqs" named after the river Araks.

References

External links 
Poems by Raphael Patkanian

1830 births
1892 deaths
Writers from Rostov-on-Don
Armenian male poets
19th-century Armenian poets
19th-century male writers
Armenian activists
Russian people of Armenian descent